Billal Bennama (born 14 June 1998) is a French boxer.

He won a medal at the 2019 AIBA World Boxing Championships.

Born in France, he is of Algerian descent.

References

1998 births
Living people
French male boxers
AIBA World Boxing Championships medalists
Flyweight boxers
Competitors at the 2018 Mediterranean Games
European Games competitors for France
Boxers at the 2019 European Games
Mediterranean Games competitors for France
French sportspeople of Algerian descent
Boxers at the 2020 Summer Olympics
Olympic boxers of France